Lake Mary Preparatory School (Lake Mary Prep) is a private school located in Lake Mary, Florida, founded in August 1999. It serves PreK-3 through 12th grade, and is co-educational and non-sectarian. It is accredited by the Florida Council of Independent Schools (FCIS), Cognia, and Southern Association of Independent Schools (SAIS).

Notable alumni

 Aubrey Peeples (class of 2012), actress and singer
 Carl Yuan, professional golfer

References

External links
 

1999 establishments in Florida
Educational institutions established in 1999
Private high schools in Florida
Private middle schools in Florida
Schools in Seminole County, Florida